Sharifah Azizah binti Syed Zain is a Malaysian politician who served as Member of the Johor State Legislative Assembly (MLA) for Penawar from May 2018 to March 2022 and for Mahkota since 12 March 2022. She is a member of the United Malays National Organisation (UMNO), a component party of the ruling BN coalition.

Election results

Honours

Honours of Malaysia 
  :
 Officer of the Order of the Defender of the Realm (KMN) (2004)
 :
  Knight Companion of the Order of the Crown of Pahang (DIMP) – Dato' (2010)

References 

Living people
1960 births
People from Kluang
People from Johor
Malaysian people of Malay descent
Malaysian Muslims
United Malays National Organisation politicians
Women MLAs in Johor
21st-century Malaysian politicians
Members of the Johor State Legislative Assembly
21st-century Malaysian women politicians